The following is a list of notable Pakistani artists active in Pakistan and abroad:

Abdul Rahim Nagori (1939–2010), painter known for his socio-political themes
Abdur Rahman Chughtai (1899–1975), painter in the Chughtai Style of Art and stamp designer
Ahmad Zoay (1947–2014), painter and sculptor
Ahmed Pervez (1926–1979), painter and winner of the President's Medal for Pride of Performance
Ajaz Anwar (born 1946), painter especially of watercolours
Anna Molka Ahmed (1917–1994), artist and pioneer of fine arts
Anwar Maqsood (born 1940), intellectual, playwright, poet, television host, satirist, humorist, and long time painter
Anwar Shemza (1928–1985), artist, writer, printmaker
Arbab Mohammad Sardar (born 1945), painter and sculptor, pride of performance
Askari Mian Irani (1940–2004), painter
Ayessha Quraishi (born 1970), contemporary artist
Bashir Mirza (1941–2000), painter
Bashir Ahmed (born 1953), miniature painter, sculptor, pioneer bachelor's degree curriculum for miniature painting 
Colin David (1937–2008), painter
Faizan Peerzada (1958–2012), artist, puppeteer, theatre director
Fakeero Solanki, sculptor
Farooq Qaiser (1945–2021), graphic designer, puppeteer, TV director
Hasnat Mehmood (born 1978), visual artist, lives and works in Lahore and teaches at National College of Arts
Hiba Schahbaz (born 1981), painter
Huma Bhabha (born 1962), sculptor
Huma Mulji (born 1970), sculptor
Eqbal Mehdi (1946–2008), painter, illustrator
Ismail Gulgee (1926–2007), painter, calligrapher
Jamil Baloch (born 1972), sculptor
Jamal Shah (born 1956), actor, director, painter, and social worker
Jamil Naqsh (1938–2019), painter
Khalid Iqbal (1929–2014), painter, art teacher, professor emeritus
Lubna Agha (1949–2012), painter
Muhammad Arshad Khan (born 1969)
Muniba Mazari (born 1987), painter, model, and activist
Quddus Mirza (born 1961), painter, art critic
Rashid Rana (born 1968), visual artist and art educator
Sadequain (1923–1987), painter
Saeed Ahmad Bodla, artist and calligrapher
Saira Wasim (born 1975), miniature artist
Salima Hashmi (born 1942), painter, author and art educator
Sanki King (born 1990), artist, painter, muralist, graffiti/sneaker/street artist
Shakir Ali (1914–1975), painter
Shazia Sikander (born 1969), miniature artist
Sumaira Tazeen (born 1973), neo miniature artist, multidisciplinary
Sughra Rababi, (1922–1994), painter, designer, sculptor
Tassaduq Sohail (1930–2017), painter and short story writer
Tazeen Qayyum (born 1973), painter, conceptual artist
Ustad Allah Baksh (1895–1978)
Zahoor ul Akhlaq (1941–1999), painter, sculptor
Zehra Laila Javeri (born 1971), painter
Zubeida Agha (1922–1997), painter
Rabia Zuberi (born ), sculptor, painter.
Rashid Rana Photographic collage artist
Gul Muhammad Khatri (1919-1979), painter
Murtaza Jafri (born 1958), painter known for NCA Lahore principal
Saeed Akhtar (born 1938), painter
Artnoob100 (born 1999), Sci-fi artist and writer

References 

Pakistani
Artists
 List
Pakistani art